Cord is an unincorporated community in Independence County, Arkansas, United States. Cord has a post office with ZIP code 72524.

Cord is served by Cedar Ridge School District. It was formed on July 1, 2004, from the consolidation of the Cord Charlotte School District and the Newark School District.

References

Unincorporated communities in Independence County, Arkansas
Unincorporated communities in Arkansas